Kainic acid, or kainate, is an acid that naturally occurs in some seaweed.  Kainic acid is a potent neuroexcitatory amino acid agonist that acts by activating receptors for glutamate, the principal excitatory neurotransmitter in the central nervous system. Glutamate is produced by the cell's metabolic processes and there are four major classifications of glutamate receptors: NMDA receptors, AMPA receptors, kainate receptors, and the metabotropic glutamate receptors. Kainic acid is an agonist for kainate receptors, a type of ionotropic glutamate receptor. Kainate receptors likely control a sodium channel that produces excitatory postsynaptic potentials (EPSPs) when glutamate binds.

Kainic acid is commonly injected into laboratory animal models to study the effects of experimental ablation. Kainic acid is a direct agonist of the glutamic kainate receptors and large doses of concentrated solutions produce immediate neuronal death by overstimulating neurons to death. Such damage and death of neurons is referred to as an excitotoxic lesion. Thus, in large, concentrated doses kainic acid can be considered a neurotoxin, and in small doses of dilute solution kainic acid will chemically stimulate neurons. In fact, kainate seems to regulate serotonergic activity in the vertebrate retina.

Electrical stimulation of designated areas of the brain are generally administered by passing an electric current through a wire that is inserted into the brain to lesion a particular area of the brain. Electrical stimulation indiscriminately destroys anything in the vicinity of the electrode tip, including neural bodies and axons of neurons passing through; therefore it is difficult to attribute the effects of the lesion to a single area. Chemical stimulation is typically administered through a cannula that is inserted into the brain via stereotactic surgery. Chemical stimulation, while more complicated than electrical stimulation, has the distinct advantage of activating cell bodies, but not nearby axons, because only cell bodies and subsequent dendrites contain glutamate receptors. Therefore, chemical stimulation by kainic acid is more localized than electrical stimulation. Both chemical and electrical lesions potentially cause additional damage to the brain due to the very nature of the inserted electrode or cannula. Therefore, the most effective ablation studies are performed in comparison to a sham lesion that duplicates all the steps of producing a brain lesion except the one that actually causes the brain damage, that is, injection of kainic acid or administration of an electrical shock.

Occurrence
Kainic acid was originally isolated from the seaweeds Digenea simplex and Chondria armata in 1953. They are called "Kainin-sou" or "Makuri" in Japan, and are used as an anthelmintic.

Pharmacological activity
Kainic acid is utilised in primary neuronal cell cultures and in the acute brain slice preparation to study the physiological effect of excitotoxicity and assess the neuroprotective capabilities of potential therapeutics. 

Kainic acid is a potent central nervous system excitant that is used in epilepsy research to induce seizures in experimental animals, at a typical dose of 10–30 mg/kg in mice. In addition to inducing seizures, kainic acid is excitotoxic and epileptogenic. Kainic acid induces seizures via activation of kainate receptors containing the GluK2 subunit and also through activation of AMPA receptors, for which it serves as a partial agonist. Also, infusion with kainic acid in the hippocampus of animals results in major damage of pyramidal neurons and subsequent seizure activity. Supply shortages beginning in 2000 have caused the cost of kainic acid to rise significantly.

Applications
 antiworming agent
 neuroscience research
 neurodegenerative agent
 modeling of epilepsy
 modeling of Alzheimer's disease

See also
 Dihydrokainic acid
 Domoic acid
 Kainate receptor

References

External links
Kainate Receptors

Amino acids
Pyrrolidines
Convulsants
Marine neurotoxins
Kainate receptor agonists
Chelating agents
Toxic amino acids
Dicarboxylic acids
Excitotoxins
Isopropenyl compounds